The discography of Billie Piper (as known as Billie), a British pop music singer, consists of two studio albums, two compilation albums, and nine singles. Piper debuted in the early 1990s as an actress, appearing in several television advertisements. She signed a recording contract with Innocent Records, a subsidiary of Virgin Records, in 1998.

Piper's debut studio album, Honey to the B, was released in October 1998. The album, which contained upbeat dance-pop songs, reached number three in New Zealand and number 14 in the United Kingdom. It was certified double platinum by Recorded Music NZ (RMNZ) and platinum by the British Phonographic Industry (BPI). Her debut single "Because We Want To" reached number one on the UK Singles Chart and Piper became the youngest British artist to release a number one single in over forty years.

Piper's second album, Walk of Life, was released in July 2000. It peaked at number 14 in the UK and number 17 in New Zealand. The album was certified silver by the BPI. Two singles from the album, "Day & Night" and "Something Deep Inside", reached the top five in the UK. By 2003, Piper retired from the recording industry, choosing instead to focus on acting.

Albums

Studio albums

Compilation albums

Extended plays

Singles

Music videos

References

External links

Discographies of British artists
Pop music discographies